The 1988–89 QMJHL season was the 20th season in the history of the Quebec Major Junior Hockey League. The QMJHL first awards the end-of-season honours of the "Rookie All-star team"  to first year players.

The Quebec Remparts franchise returned as Longueuil Collège Français, bringing the league up to eleven teams. The league dissolved its divisions, and each team played 70 games each in the schedule. 
The league made it mandatory for all the teams players to wear a full face shield covering their entire face.

On February 9, 1989, the Drummondville Voltigeurs' coach and general manager Jean Bégin was suspended indefinitely after he was arrested and charged with sexual assault.

The Trois-Rivières Draveurs finished first overall in the regular season, winning their third Jean Rougeau Trophy. The Laval Titan won their first President's Cup since changing the name from the Laval Voisins, by defeating the Victoriaville Tigres in the finals.

Team changes
 The dormant Quebec Remparts are resurrected as Longueuil Collège Français, playing in Longueuil, Quebec.

Final standings
Note: GP = Games played; W = Wins; L = Losses; T = Ties; Pts = Points; GF = Goals for; GA = Goals against

complete list of standings.

Scoring leaders
Note: GP = Games played; G = Goals; A = Assists; Pts = Points; PIM = Penalties in Minutes

 Complete scoring statistics

Playoffs
Yves Racine was the leading scorer of the playoffs with 33 points (3 goals, 30 assists).

Division semifinals
 Shawinigan Cataractes defeated Trois-Rivières Draveurs 4 games to 0.
 Laval Titan defeated Granby Bisons 4 games to 0.
 Hull Olympiques defeated Saint-Jean Castors 4 games to 0.
 Victoriaville Tigres defeated Drummondville Voltigeurs 4 games to 0.

Division Finals
 Laval Titan defeated Shawinigan Cataractes 4 games to 2.
 Victoriaville Tigres defeated Hull Olympiques 4 games to 1.

Finals
 Laval Titan defeated Victoriaville Tigres 4 games to 3.

All-star teams
First team
 Goaltender - Stephane Fiset, Victoriaville Tigres
 Left defence - Yves Racine, Victoriaville Tigres  
 Right defence - Eric Dubois, Laval Titan 
 Left winger - Steve Chartrand, Drummondville Voltigeurs 
 Centreman - Stephane Morin, Chicoutimi Saguenéens  
 Right winger - Donald Audette, Laval Titan    
 Coach - Dany Dube, Trois-Rivières Draveurs
Second team
 Goaltender - Andre Racicot, Granby Bisons   
 Left defence - Steve Veilleux, Trois-Rivières Draveurs  
 Right defence - Guy Dupuis, Hull Olympiques
 Left winger - Michel Picard, Trois-Rivières Draveurs
 Centreman - Jeremy Roenick, Hull Olympiques
 Right winger - Ed Courtenay, Granby Bisons & J. F. Quintin, Shawinigan Cataractes
 Coach - Gilbert Perreault, Victoriaville Tigres
Rookie team
 Goaltender - Felix Potvin, Chicoutimi Saguenéens 
 Left defence - Karl Dykhuis, Hull Olympiques
 Right defence - Yannick Lemay, Trois-Rivières Draveurs
 Left winger - Pierre Sevigny, Verdun Junior Canadiens 
 Centreman - Yanic Perreault, Trois-Rivières Draveurs
 Right winger - Marc Rodgers, Granby Bisons
 Coach - Paulin Bordeleau, Laval Titan
 List of First/Second/Rookie team all-stars.

Trophies and awards
Team
President's Cup - Playoff Champions, Laval Titan
Jean Rougeau Trophy - Regular Season Champions, Trois-Rivières Draveurs
Robert Lebel Trophy - Team with best GAA, Hull Olympiques

Player
Michel Brière Memorial Trophy - Most Valuable Player, Stephane Morin, Chicoutimi Saguenéens
Jean Béliveau Trophy - Top Scorer, Stephane Morin, Chicoutimi Saguenéens  
Guy Lafleur Trophy - Playoff MVP, Donald Audette, Laval Titan 
Jacques Plante Memorial Trophy - Best GAA, Stephane Fiset, Victoriaville Tigres
Emile Bouchard Trophy - Defenceman of the Year, Yves Racine, Victoriaville Tigres 
Mike Bossy Trophy - Best Pro Prospect, Patrice Brisebois, Laval Titan 
Michel Bergeron Trophy - Offensive Rookie of the Year, Yanic Perreault, Trois-Rivières Draveurs  
Raymond Lagacé Trophy - Defensive Rookie of the Year, Karl Dykhuis, Hull Olympiques 
Frank J. Selke Memorial Trophy - Most sportsmanlike player, Steve Cadieux, Shawinigan Cataractes 
Marcel Robert Trophy - Best Scholastic Player, Daniel Lacroix, Granby Bisons

See also
1989 Memorial Cup
1989 NHL Entry Draft
1988–89 OHL season
1988–89 WHL season

References

Quebec Major Junior Hockey League seasons
QMJHL